Tomović (Cyrillic script: Томовић) is a Serbian patronymic surname derived from a masculine given name Tomo. It may refer to:

Branko Tomović (born 1980), actor
Dimitrije Tomović (born 1996), Serbian footballer 
Nenad Tomović (born 1987), footballer
Rajko Tomović (1919–2001), scientist
Vasilije Tomović (born 1906), chess master

Serbian surnames
Patronymic surnames